The 1957–58 NBA season was the Lakers' tenth season in the NBA.

Regular season

Season standings

x – clinched playoff spot

Record vs. opponents

Game log

Awards and records
 Dick Garmaker, NBA All-Star Game
 Larry Foust, NBA All-Star Game

References

Los Angeles Lakers seasons
Minneapolis
Minnesota Lakers
Minnesota Lakers